William Hill Brown (November 1765 – September 2, 1793) was an American novelist, the author of what is usually considered the first American novel, The Power of Sympathy (1789), and "Harriot, or the Domestic Reconciliation", as well as the serial essay "The Reformer", published in Isaiah Thomas' Massachusetts Magazine.

Life
Brown was born in Boston, Massachusetts, the son of Gawen Brown and his third wife, Elizabeth Hill Adams. Gawen Brown was from Northumberland, England and was a clockmaker. William was christened at the Hollis Street Church on December 1, 1765. 

In 1789, William Brown published the novel The Power of Sympathy. Brown had an extensive knowledge of European literature, for example of Clarissa by Samuel Richardson, but tries to lift the American literature from the British corpus by choice of an American setting. The book drew close comparison to a local scandal and was subsequently withdrawn from sale. He contributed a number of essays to the Columbian Centinel.

Around October 1792, Brown himself withdrew to join his sister, Eliza Brown Hinchborne, at the Hinchborne plantation near Murfreesboro, North Carolina, and began to read law with William Richardson Davie at Halifax. Eliza died in January 1793. Not yet acclimated to the Eastern North Carolina climate, William Brown died of fever, probably malaria, the following August, at the age of twenty-seven.

Works
Brown held the conviction that novels should aim at some high moral purpose. 
 Harriot, or the Domestic Reconciliation (1789)
 The Power of Sympathy (1789)
 Selected Poems and Verse Fables 1784-1793 by William Hill Brown (posthumous)
 Ira and Isabella (1807)

Further reading
 Davidson, Cathy N. "‘The Power of Sympathy’ Reconsidered: William Hill Brown as Literary Craftsman", Early American Literature, vol. 10, no. 1, 1975, pp. 14–29

References

External Links
 
 Biography of Brown

1765 births
1793 deaths
18th-century American dramatists and playwrights
Writers from Boston
18th-century American novelists
18th-century American male writers
American male novelists
American male dramatists and playwrights
Novelists from Massachusetts